Within the Law is a 1923 American silent drama film directed by Frank Lloyd and starring Norma Talmadge. In 2009 the film was released on DVD along with Talmadge's 1926 film Kiki. Jane Cowl had starred in the original 1912 Broadway production of Bayard Veiller's play of the same name about a young woman who is sent to prison and comes out seeking revenge.

Cast

References

External links

Lantern slide at silenthollywood.com
Stills and lobby cards at the Norma Talmadge website

1923 films
American silent feature films
Films directed by Frank Lloyd
1923 drama films
Silent American drama films
First National Pictures films
American black-and-white films
Films with screenplays by Frances Marion
1920s American films